Esos que dicen amarse is a 1992 Argentine telenovela, which aired on Canal 9. It stars Raul Taibo, Carolina Papaleo and Amelia Bence.

References

1992 telenovelas
1990s Argentine television series
1992 Argentine television series debuts
1992 Argentine television series endings
Argentine telenovelas
Spanish-language telenovelas
El Nueve original programming